Dave Knudson may refer to:

Dave Knudson (guitarist), guitarist for Minus The Bear (ex-Botch)
Dave Knudson (politician) (born 1950), South Dakota State Senate Majority Leader and candidate for governor